Piyejik (also Romanized as Pīyejīk; also known as Pīeh Jīk and Pīyeh Jīk) is a village in Qeshlaq Rural District, in the Central District of Ahar County, East Azerbaijan Province, Iran. At the 2006 census, its population was 127, in 24 families.

References 

Populated places in Ahar County